Apulum may refer to:

The Latin name of Alba Iulia
Apulum (castra), the Roman fort of Alba Iulia
Apulum (company), a Romanian porcelain manufacturing company
Apulum (Acta Musei Apulensis), a periodical issued by the National Museum of Unification Alba Iulia
Apulum Alba Iulia, the former name of FC Unirea Alba Iulia, a football team